Huntington is a city in Angelina County, Texas, United States. The population was 2,025 at the 2020 census. The site is named for Collis Potter Huntington, the chairman of the board of the Southern Pacific Railroad when the town was formed and one of the Big Four. Huntington is known as the "Gateway to Lake Sam Rayburn".

Geography

Huntington is located in eastern Angelina County at  (31.279227, –94.572881).

Demographics

As of the 2020 United States census, there were 2,025 people, 1,172 households, and 851 families residing in the city.

As of the census of 2000, there were 2,068 people, 757 households, and 560 families residing in the city. The population density was 758.0 people per square mile (292.5/km2). There were 894 housing units at an average density of 327.7 per square mile (126.4/km2). The racial makeup of the city was 87.19% White, 8.56% African American, 0.58% Native American, 0.19% Asian, 1.35% from other races, and 2.13% from two or more races. Hispanic or Latino of any race were 3.72% of the population.

There were 757 households, out of which 41.2% had children under the age of 18 living with them, 52.8% were married couples living together, 17.3% had a female householder with no husband present, and 25.9% were non-families. 23.9% of all households were made up of individuals, and 12.5% had someone living alone who was 65 years of age or older. The average household size was 2.73 and the average family size was 3.25.

In the city, the population was spread out, with 32.0% under the age of 18, 9.9% from 18 to 24, 26.3% from 25 to 44, 19.6% from 45 to 64, and 12.2% who were 65 years of age or older. The median age was 32 years. For every 100 females, there were 91.0 males. For every 100 females age 18 and over, there were 82.8 males.

The median income for a household in the city was $56,862, and the median income for a family was $52,953. Males had a median income of $36,338 versus $29,554 for females. The per capita income for the city was $11,989. About 11.1% of families and 14.2% of the population were below the poverty line, including 14.5% of those under age 18 and 9.4% of those age 65 or over.

Education
Huntington is served by the Huntington Independent School District

Notable people
Jack Tinsley, journalist

Newspaper
Huntington's local newspaper is the Huntington Herald, serving Huntington, Zavalla, Etoile, and Homer. It is a free monthly paper that can be found in most of the local stores and business establishments throughout the area.

References

External links
 City of Huntington official website
  entry in the Handbook of Texas Online
Huntington family

Cities in Angelina County, Texas
Cities in Texas